Edmund Thornton Parkin (1912 – 1 August 1994) was a Canadian landscape architect. In March 1947, Parkin joined the firm John B. Parkin Associates, which had been started that January by his older brother John B. Parkin and the unrelated John C. Parkin. Edmund remained one of the senior partners in the firm until his retirement in 1964. He also served as President of the Rotory Club of Toronto. Parkin died in 1994.

References

External links
 John Burnett Parkin
 John Parkin and Associates

People from Toronto
1912 births
1994 deaths
20th-century Canadian architects